Inchgower distillery is a whisky distillery producing a single malt of the same name located on the outskirts of Buckie, Moray, Scotland.

The distillery was built in 1871 to replace Tochineal Distillery but liquidated in 1903. Buckie Council purchased the concern in 1936 and ownership was transferred to Arthur Bell & Sons Ltd in 1938 and indeed to this very day the Bell's logo is used in the advertising of Inchgower. The current operator of Inchgower is Diageo. Since 1966 Inchgower has operated four stills.

The distillations of Inchgower contribute to Bell's blended whisky.

The Inchgower is classified as a Lower Speyside Malt and takes its water from a burn rising in the Menduff Hills to the south of Buckie.

References

Distilleries in Scotland
Scottish malt whisky
1871 establishments in Scotland
Food and drink companies established in 1871
Food and drink companies disestablished in 1903
Companies based in Moray
Buckie
Re-established companies
Food and drink companies established in 1936
1936 establishments in Scotland
1938 mergers and acquisitions
British companies disestablished in 1903
1903 disestablishments in Scotland